Anastrepha is the most diverse genus in the American tropics and subtropics. Currently, it comprises more than 300 described species, including nine major pest species, such as the Mexican fruit fly (A. ludens), the South American fruit fly (A. fraterculus complex), the West Indian fruit fly (A. obliqua), the sapote fruit fly (A. serpentina), the Caribbean fruit fly (A. suspensa), the American guava fruit fly (A. striata), and the pumpkin fruit fly (A. grandis), as well as the papaya fruit fly (formerly Toxotrypana curvicada and T. littoralis). As some of their names suggest, these pest species are one of the most numerous and damaging groups of insects in their native range, plaguing commercial fruits such as citrus, mango, guava, and papaya.

Biology and ecology

Natural history and life cycle 
Females lay their eggs in either developing and healthy fruits or in mature and rotten fruit (like the A. suspensa). The vast majority of species use their ovipositor to deposit the eggs in the edible part of the fruit (either the epicarp or mesocarp), and some species such as A. hamata and A. intermedia lay the eggs in the seed. Eggs can be laid in one or a group of eggs per oviposition, and it could vary among species. After the egg hatches inside the fruit, larvae complete three larval instars. Once larvae is fully mature make a hole to come out of the fruit, and it most happen when the fruit is on the ground. Then, the larva makes a hole on the ground to become a pupa. The life cycle begin again when the female emerge and become mature to produce eggs by feeding on sources of carbohydrate and protein. The life cycle (egg to adult) of Anastrepha ludens takes 27 days or longer if the temperature is lower than 30 °C.

Natural enemies are mainly in the families Braconidae and Ichneumonidae (Hymenoptera). Diachasmimorpha longicaudata and Doryctobracon crawfordi are established in the Americas, including the United States, Mexico, Colombia, Costa Rica, Guatemala, El Salvador, Nicaragua, Panama, and Brazil. These species has been released as an agent of biological control of pest species, such as A. ludens, A. obliqua, A. suspensa.

Host plants 
Larvae attack plants in the families Sapotaceae, Moraceae, Malvaceae, Myrtaceae, Passifloraceae, Anacardiaceae, and Rutaceae. Larvae feed on the pulp or on the seeds. Host plant information for the major pest species is available online in the Compendium of Fruit Fly Host Information (https://coffhi.cphst.org/).

Gradient of altitude and habitat 
Species of this genus are found across a wide range of altitude and habitats. The gradient of altitude has been documented from 0 - 2.600 m above sea level, but the highest diversity is found below 1,000 m. One extreme exception is the morphotype Brazil 1 in the Anastrepha fraterculus complex that attacks peach, apple, cherry and other host in a dry, temperate and high valley system (Valle Sagrado de los Incas, Cusco, Peru) at 2,600 m. Common pest species are abundant and found in crops, orchards, backyard trees, and rare species occur in secondary or primary forest, and edges or boundaries of patches of forest between 750–820 m. Anastrepha is mainly associated with tropical rainforests, but it is also found in subtropical regions such as southern of Florida. However, Anastrepha tehuacana was described and documented from a mojave dessert in Puebla, Mexico, and it feeds on seeds of Euphorbia tehuacana.

Taxonomy and systematics

Phylogenetics and taxonomy 
Anastrepha is morphologically and molecularly classified in 23 species group. However, the most recent molecular phylogeny suggested to split the genus in 27 groups, including those species in the former genus Toxotrypana. Norrbom et al. proposed to synonymize Toxotrypana and keep the genus name Anastrepha because it comprises more pest species of agricultural importance. Also, they proposed nomenclature changes where all the seven originally described species in Toxotrypana are now under the genus Anastrepha as follows: Anastrepha australis (Blanchard 1960), Anastrepha curvicauda (Gerstaecker 1860), Anastrepha littoralis (Blanchard 1960), Anastrepha nigra (Blanchard 1960), Anastrepha picciola (Blanchard 1960), Anastrepha proseni (Blanchard 1960), Anastrepha recurcauda (Tigrero 1992). Additionally, a new name was assigned to the species previously known Anastrepha nigra Norrbom & Korytkowski, 2009 which is now Anastrepha nigrina Norrbom, 2018 because of priority rule.

Cryptic species 
The Anastrepha fraterculus complex is still a mystery that remains unsolved. This began in 1942 when Stone observed morphological differences between populations from Central America and South America. Since then, adult and larvae morphology, molecular, isozyme, karyotype, host plants relationships, behavioral and mating compatibility have been studied. The conclusion from a group with multidisciplinary expertise is that Anastrepha fraterculus sensu latus comprises eight cryptic species (morphotypes) with a wide range of geographical distribution. One of them occur in Mexico and Central America (Mexican morphotype), and seven are found in South America (Colombia, Venezuela, Guianas, Brazil, Paraguay, Bolivia, Argentina, Peru, Ecuador); and four are recognizable and well documented morphotypes (Mexican, Andean, Peruvian and Brazil 1) which are distinguishable and represent biological species. Also, these cryptic species have a wide host plant range, and they attack 124 host plant species in 39 plant families. Thus, eight morphotypes are recognized, geographical distribution and host plant are better understood, but morphological and molecular techniques are still unreliable to identify specimens within this complex.

Larval morphology 
The Immature stages of Anastrepha are poorly known. There are only 20 Anastrepha species with thorough description of eggs which include photomicroscopy. With regard to larval description, there are only 22 thorough description of the third instar-larval which represent less than 10% of the total number of described species to date. Ideally, a complete larval description should include a combination of drawings and imagery (using compound microscope and SEM) of the morphological structures such as antennal and maxillary sensory organ, oral ridges, Cephalopharyngeal skeleton (CPS), both dorsal and ventral spinules, and anterior and posterior spiracles.

In addition, larval morphology has not found characters with phylogenetic signal yet. One of the limitation has been acquiring the specimens from a broader range of geographical distribution, and larvae have been mostly described from one location (one country) or colony culture instead. Also, description of third-instar larval is only known from 11 species groups which are mostly represented by one or two Anastrepha species. Thirdly, feeding behavior (pulp or seed feeder) has not been very well documented and included as an evolutionary trait to enhance the phylogeny reconstruction. Thus, collection and description of immature stages of more species is badly needed to identify synapomorphies among the species group.

Identification 
Thorough knowledge of the morphology of Anastrepha is critical to run a taxonomic key and identify species. Morphological characters on the head, thorax, abdomen and ovipositor are very used in both traditional dichotomous and interactive key. In addition, it is important to know that some species groups in this genus need further revision, so that the identification could be difficult. To date, the most comprehensive identification tool for adult is available online, and it was developed by Norrbom et al. 2019. However, there are 28 more Anastrepha species, which were described by Norrbom in 2015, that are not included yet in the interactive key.

Knowledge of the larval morphology is important to identify genera and species. At least, there are three sources which are helpful for identification, but they are out of date to accurately identify larvae up to level of species. Thorough larval morphology is available online at http://www.delta-intkey.com/ffl/index.htm

Species 
There are more than 300 Anastrepha species. This includes seven species from the former genus Toxotrypana, 266 species previously known, and 28 species described by Norrbom in 2015. From that total, thorough description and images of 273 species on the list below are freely available online at http://www.delta-intkey.com/anatox/index.htm.

Distribution 
Genus Anastrepha is widespread from southern United States (Texas and Florida) to northern Argentina, including Great and Lesser Antilles. The country records include United States, Mexico, Belize, Bolivia, Brazil, Colombia, Costa Rica, Ecuador, British Guiana, French Guiana, Guatemala, Guyana, Honduras, Mexico, Nicaragua, Peru, Suriname, Cuba, Republica Dominicana, Puerto Rico, Jamaica, Trinidad and Tobago, Argentina, Paraguay, and Venezuela.

References 

Trypetinae
Tephritidae genera
Taxa named by Ignaz Rudolph Schiner